Jasna Ptujec (born 19 January 1959 in Zagreb) is a former Yugoslav/Croatian handball player born in Croatian-Slovenian family. who competed in the 1984 Summer Olympics.

She was a member of the Yugoslav handball team which won the gold medal. She played all five matches as goalkeeper.

References

External links
profile

1959 births
Living people
Croatian female handball players
Handball players at the 1984 Summer Olympics
Olympic handball players of Yugoslavia
Yugoslav female handball players
Olympic gold medalists for Yugoslavia
Olympic medalists in handball
Croatian people of Slovenian descent
Medalists at the 1984 Summer Olympics